Al Hall may refer to:

Albert Hall (athlete) (1934–2008), American hammer thrower
Al Hall (musician) (1915–1988), American jazz bassist
Al Hall (baseball) (died 1885), 19th-century baseball player